The United States of America (USA) competed at the 2004 Summer Olympics in Athens, Greece. 533 competitors, 279 men and 254 women, took part in 254 events in 31 sports.

Medalists

|  style="text-align:left; width:78%; vertical-align:top;"|

|  style="text-align:left; width:22%; vertical-align:top;"|

* – Indicates the athlete competed in preliminaries but not the final

Archery

Three U.S. archers qualified each for the men's and women's individual archery, and a spot each for both men's and women's teams.

Men

Women

Athletics (track and field)

U.S. athletes have so far achieved qualifying standards in the following athletics events (up to a maximum of 3 athletes in each event at the 'A' Standard, and 1 at the 'B' Standard). The team was selected based on the results of the 2004 United States Olympic Trials.

Adam Nelson originally claimed a silver medal in men's shot put. On December 5, 2012, the International Olympic Committee and the IAAF stripped off Ukrainian shot putter Yuriy Bilonoh's gold medal after drug re-testings of his samples were discovered positive. Following the announcement of Bilonoh's disqualification, Nelson's medal was upgraded to gold.

Men
Track & road events

Field events

Combined events – Decathlon

Women
Track & road events

Field events

Combined events – Heptathlon

Badminton

The United States had been represented in one out of five events.

Basketball

Summary

Men's tournament

Roster

Group play

Quarterfinals

Semifinals

Bronze medal final

Women's tournament

Roster

Group play

Quarterfinals

Semifinals

Gold medal final

Boxing

Canoeing

Slalom

Sprint
Men

Women

Qualification Legend: Q = Qualify to final; q = Qualify to semifinal

Cycling

Road
Men

Women

Track
Sprint

Pursuit

Keirin

Omnium

Mountain biking

Diving

U.S. divers qualified for eight individual diving spots at the 2004 Olympic Games. Three US synchronized diving teams qualified through the 2004 FINA Diving World Cup and the rest of the divers qualified for the Olympics through the 2004 U.S. Olympic Trials for diving.

Men

Women

Equestrian

Because only three horse and rider pairs from each nation could advance beyond certain rounds in the individual events, five American pairs did not advance despite being placed sufficiently high.  They received rankings below all pairs that did advance.

Dressage

Eventing

"#" indicates that the score of this rider does not count in the team competition, since only the best three results of a team are counted.

Jumping

Fencing

Men

Women

Football (soccer)

Summary

Women's tournament

Roster

Group play

Quarterfinals

Semifinals

Gold medal final

Gymnastics

Artistic
Men
Team

Individual finals

Women
Team

Individual finals

Rhythmic

Trampoline

Judo

Twelve American judoka (seven male and five female) qualified for the 2004 Summer Olympics.

Men

Women

Modern pentathlon

Four U.S. athletes qualified to compete in the modern pentathlon event through the 2003 Pan American Games in Santo Domingo, Dominican Republic.

Rowing

The U.S. rowers qualified the following boats:

Men

Women

Qualification Legend: FA=Final A (medal); FB=Final B (non-medal); FC=Final C (non-medal); FD=Final D (non-medal); FE=Final E (non-medal); FF=Final F (non-medal); SA/B=Semifinals A/B; SC/D=Semifinals C/D; SE/F=Semifinals E/F; R=Repechage

Sailing

U.S. sailors have qualified one boat for each of the following events.

Men

Women

Open

M = Medal race; OCS = On course side of the starting line; DSQ = Disqualified; DNF = Did not finish; DNS= Did not start; RDG = Redress given

Shooting

Twenty-one U.S. shooters (twelve men and nine women) qualified to compete in the following events:

Men

Women

Softball

Summary

Squad

Results
Group Stage All times are Eastern European Time (UTC+2)

Final Group Standings
The top four teams advanced to the semifinal round.

Semifinals

Grand final

Swimming

U.S. swimmers earned qualifying standards in the following events (up to a maximum of 2 swimmers in each event at the A-standard time, and 1 at the B-standard time): Swimmers qualified at the 2004 U.S. Olympic Trials (for pool events).

Men

Women

Synchronized swimming

Nine U.S. synchronized swimmers qualified a spot in the women's team.

Table tennis

Seven U.S. table tennis players qualified for the following events. Ilija Lupulesku and Jasna Fazlić previously competed for Yugoslavia since the sport made its debut at the 1988 Summer Olympics.

Men

Women

Taekwondo

Two U.S. taekwondo jin qualified to compete.

Tennis

The United States Tennis Association nominated six male and six female tennis players to compete in the tennis tournament.

Men

Women

Triathlon

Six U.S. triathletes qualified for the following events.

Volleyball

Beach

Indoor

Summary

Men's tournament

Roster

Group play

Quarterfinal

Semifinals

Bronze medal match

Women's tournament

Roster

Group play

Quarterfinals

Water polo

The U.S. men's and women's water polo teams qualified by winning the water polo event at the 2003 Pan American Games.

Summary

Men's tournament

Roster

Group play

7th to 10th place classification

7th place match

Women's tournament

Roster

Group play

Semifinal

Bronze medal final

Weightlifting

Five U.S. weightlifters qualified for the following events:

Wrestling

The U.S. wrestlers qualified to compete in all events except the men's Greco-Roman 74 kg class.

Men's freestyle

Men's Greco-Roman

Women's freestyle

See also
United States at the 2003 Pan American Games
United States at the 2004 Summer Paralympics

References

External links
Official Report of the XXVIII Olympiad
U.S. Olympic Team

Nations at the 2004 Summer Olympics
2004
Summer Olympics